State Highway 116 (abbreviated SH-116) is a state highway in Delaware County, Oklahoma, United States.

Route description
SH-116 begins at US-59/SH-10 four miles (6 km) west of Colcord. It then runs to the Arkansas state line, where it becomes AR-12, which connects to Rogers, Arkansas.

Junction list

References

External links
SH-116 at OKHighways

116
Transportation in Delaware County, Oklahoma